49777 Cappi, provisional designation , is a stony background asteroid from the inner regions of the asteroid belt, approximately 2 kilometers in diameter.

The asteroid was discovered on 2 December 1999, by Italian–American astronomer Paul Comba at the Prescott Observatory in Arizona, United States. It was named after the discoverer's wife, Margaret Capitola Sonntag Comba.

Orbit and classification 

Cappi is a non-family from the main belt's background population. It orbits the Sun in the inner asteroid belt at a distance of 2.2–2.5 AU once every 3 years and 7 months (1,321 days; semi-major axis of 2.36 AU). Its orbit has an eccentricity of 0.07 and an inclination of 4° with respect to the ecliptic.

The asteroid's observation arc begins 8 years prior to its official discovery observation, with a precovery taken by the Steward Observatory's Spacewatch survey at Kitt Peak in September 1991.

Physical characteristics 

Cappi is an assumed stony S-type asteroid.

Rotation and shape 

In September 2013, a rotational lightcurve of Cappi was obtained from photometric observation taken in the R-band at the Palomar Transient Factory in California. It showed a rotation period of  hours with a brightness amplitude of 0.78 magnitude, indicating a non-spheroidal shape.

Diameter and albedo estimate 

The Collaborative Asteroid Lightcurve Link assumes a standard albedo for stony asteroids of 0.20 and calculates a diameter of 1.85 kilometers with an absolute magnitude of 16.02.

Naming 

This minor planet was named after Margaret Capitola Sonntag Comba (born 1940), a psychologist and art therapist by profession, faculty member at Prescott College, and wife of the discoverer. The approved naming citation was published by the Minor Planet Center on 4 May 2004 .

References

External links 
 Asteroid Lightcurve Database (LCDB), query form (info )
 Dictionary of Minor Planet Names, Google books
 Asteroids and comets rotation curves, CdR – Observatoire de Genève, Raoul Behrend
 Discovery Circumstances: Numbered Minor Planets (45001)-(50000) – Minor Planet Center
 
 

049777
Discoveries by Paul G. Comba
Named minor planets
19991202